Diceratidae is a family of rudists, a group of unusual extinct saltwater clams, marine heterodont bivalves in the order Hippuritida.

Genera
Genera within the family Diceratidae:
†Diceras Lamarck, 1805

References
Paleobiology Database
Biolib

Prehistoric bivalve families
Jurassic first appearances
Cretaceous extinctions
Hippuritida